Visp railway station is a junction station at Visp (French: Viège), in the canton of Valais, Switzerland. It has a modern station building completed in 2007, and is served by two standard gauge lines and a metre gauge line.

Visp station is now the busiest railway station in Valais.

Every day, about 230 trains stop at Visp, and approximately 18,400 passengers use the station, mostly for changing to and from trains calling at Sion.

Rail services to Visp

Standard gauge
The older of the two standard gauge lines serving Visp is the Simplon Railway, which links (Genève-Aéroport, Genève and) Lausanne on Lake Geneva with Brig, at the northern portal of the Simplon Tunnel, via Sion and Visp.

In 2007, Visp became a standard gauge junction station, upon the opening of the New Railway Link through the Alps (NRLA), connecting (Bern and) Spiez with Brig and the Simplon Tunnel, via the Lötschberg Base Tunnel and Visp.

All of the standard gauge passenger trains stopping at Visp are operated by SBB CFF FFS, even though the Lötschberg Base Tunnel is owned by another railway company, BLS AG.

Metre gauge
Visp is also served by the metre gauge Brig-Visp-Zermatt railway (BVZ). Since , the BVZ has been owned and operated by the Matterhorn Gotthard Bahn (MGB), following a merger between the BVZ and the Furka Oberalp Bahn (FO).

The MGB also operates metre gauge regional services from Zermatt to Visp, and from Visp to Brig and beyond, at hourly intervals.

The Lötschberg Base Tunnel renovations
Following an architecture competition, a new station building was constructed at Visp to coincide with the opening of the Lötschberg Base Tunnel. The new station building is four storeys high, and features blue mirror glass cladding. In 2007, Visp station won the inaugural FLUX Prize, which is awarded to particularly well designed Swiss transport hubs.

Upon the opening of the Lötschberg Base Tunnel, Visp station became a major exchange station for surrounding towns such as Sion, and Martigny and wintersport areas like Saas Fee, Saas Grund und Zermatt, partly because the Base Tunnel emerges shortly before Visp, and bypasses the larger towns.

In the aftermath of the station's reconstruction, the population of Visp grew significantly. Whereas the town had had 6,100 residents in 2006, the population grew by 2008 to 7,100 inhabitants. That is an increase of nearly 10% in only two years. The reason for the increase is the new residential area of Visp-West, which is also a consequence of the station's rebuilding. In only three years, Visp-West should accommodate a further 3,000 residents.

Since the rebuild, there has also been a change in international traffic flows, with trains between Basel and Milan now passing through Visp and Brig via the Lötschberg Base Tunnel, instead of bypassing the town via the Lötschberg railway line (including the old Lötschberg Tunnel) and Brig.

See also

SBB CFF FFS
Lötschberg Base Tunnel
Matterhorn Gotthard Bahn
Brig–Visp–Zermatt railway

References

Notes

Sources

External links
 
Interactive station plan (Visp)
 Swiss Federal Railways 
 Matterhorn Gotthard Bahn 
 Official timetable of Switzerland

Matterhorn Gotthard Bahn stations
Railway stations in the canton of Valais

Swiss Federal Railways stations